Gregory Alan Williams (born June 12, 1956) sometimes credited as  Gregalan Williams, is an American actor and author. He is best known for portraying LAPD Officer Garner Ellerbee in Baywatch. From 2011 until 2013, Williams portrayed the role of Coach Pat Purnell in the USA Network series  Necessary Roughness. Williams also appeared on the 2015 ABC series Secrets and Lies and then on Greenleaf, and later on 2017's Manhunt: Unabomber, and beginning in 2019 The Righteous Gemstones.

Life and acting career
Born in Des Moines, Iowa, Williams graduated from East High School, and attended Coe College and served in the United States Marine Corps before pursuing a career in acting. He made his acting debut opposite Steven Seagal in the 1988 film Above the Law. The following year, Williams won the role of Garner Ellerbee in Baywatch. He reprised the role in the 1995 spin-off series Baywatch Nights before returning to Baywatch in 1996.

After leaving the series in 1998, Williams has had recurring guest roles on The Sopranos, The West Wing, The District, The Game, Army Wives, and Drop Dead Diva. Additionally, he has guest starred in episodes of NYPD Blue, Boston Legal, One Tree Hill, and Meet the Browns and has also lent his voice to the animated series Aqua Teen Hunger Force. From 2009 to 2013, Williams appeared as Judge Warren Libby in the comedy series Drop Dead Diva. Since 2011, Williams has portrayed the role of Coach Pat Purnell in the USA Network drama series Necessary Roughness.

Williams has also had roles in several films, including Remember the Titans (2000), Old School (2003), Be Cool (2005), Dog Days of Summer (2007), Oliver Stone's biopic W. (2008), The Collector (2009), and MacGruber (2010). Williams also serves as the host of the syndicated series Know Your Heritage and Know Your Heritage: Black College Quiz.

Writing
In addition to acting, Williams has authored four books including A Gathering of Heroes: Reflections on Rage and Responsibility: A Memoir of the Los Angeles Riots. The book chronicles Williams' life and experiences with racism, along with an incident during the 1992 Los Angeles riots in which Williams saved the life of a Japanese American man who was being beaten by rioters.

Filmography

Film

Television

Video Games

Bibliography

References

External links

1956 births
20th-century American novelists
21st-century American novelists
20th-century American male actors
21st-century American male actors
African-American male actors
African-American novelists
African-American television personalities
American male film actors
American male novelists
American male television actors
American male voice actors
Coe College alumni
Living people
Male actors from Des Moines, Iowa
United States Marines
Writers from Des Moines, Iowa
20th-century American male writers
21st-century American male writers
Novelists from Iowa
20th-century African-American writers
21st-century African-American writers
African-American male writers